The 2003 National AFL Under 18 Championships was the eighth edition of the AFL Under 18 Championships. Eight teams competed in the championships: Vic Metro, Vic Country, South Australia and Western Australia in Division 1, and New South Wales/Australian Capital Territory (NSW/ACT), Northern Territory, Queensland and Tasmania in Division 2. The competition was played over three rounds across two divisions. Vic Country and NSW/ACT were the Division 1 and Division 2 champions, respectively. The Michael Larke Medal (for the best player in Division 1) was awarded to Western Australia's Kepler Bradley, and the Hunter Harrison Medal (for the best player in Division 2) was won by Queensland's Jake Furfaro.

Results

Division 1

Division 1 Ladder

Division 2

Division 2 Ladder

Under 18 All-Australian team
The 2003 Under 18 All-Australian team was named on 13 July 2003:

New South Wales/Australian Capital Territory: Shaun Daly, Nick Potter
Northern Territory: Tom Logan
Queensland: Jake Furfaro
South Australia: Adam Cooney, David Kellett, Brad Symes, Beau Waters, Josh Willoughby
Vic Country: Troy Chaplin, Ryley Dunn, Colin Sylvia, Kane Tenace, Andrew Walker
Victoria Metro: Eddie Betts, Ricky Dyson, Luke Herrington, Brock McLean, Brayden Shaw, Fergus Watts
Western Australia: Kepler Bradley, Farren Ray

Coach: Leon Harris (Vic Country)
Assistant Coach: Rod Carter (NSW/ACT)

References

Under 18